Torteval may refer to:

Torteval, Guernsey, one of the ten parishes of Guernsey
Torteval-Quesnay, a former commune in the Calvados department in the Normandy region in northwestern France